Events from the year 1767 in art.

Events
 March – Giovanni Battista Tiepolo is commissioned to paint seven altarpieces for the Convento de San Pascual, Aranjuez, at this time under construction, by its founder Charles III of Spain; these include The Immaculate Conception.
 Canaletto (1697–1768) spends his last full year painting, in Venice.

Paintings

 Francis Cotes – The infant Charlotte, Princess Royal, with her mother, Queen Charlotte
 Jean-Honoré Fragonard – The Swing (Wallace Collection, London)
 Philip James de Loutherbourg – Landscape with Animals
 David Martin – Benjamin Franklin
 Richard Paton – The Battle of Cape Passaro, 11 August 1718
 Joshua Reynolds – Elizabeth, Lady Amherst (Elizabeth, Lady Amherst)
 Alexander Roslin
 Double portrait of himself and his wife, Marie, painting a portrait of Henrik Peill
 Portrait of Jean-François Marmontel
 Johann Zoffany – John, 3rd Duke of Atholl, and family

Births
 January 5 – Anne-Louis Girodet de Roussy-Trioson, French painter (died 1824)
 January 24 – Emanuel Thelning, Swedish-born Finnish painter (died 1831)
 February 18 – John Glover, English-born Australian landscape painter (died 1849)
 March 9 – Johan Erik Hedberg, Finnish painter (died 1823)
 March 17 – Charles Peale Polk, American portrait painter (died 1822)
 April 10 – William Alexander, English painter, illustrator and engraver (died 1816)
 April 11 – Jean-Baptiste Isabey, French painter (died 1855)
 April 24 – Jacques-Laurent Agasse, Swiss animal and landscape painter (died 1849)
 date unknown
 Immanuel Alm, Finnish painter of primarily religious-themed works (died 1809)
 George Barret, Jr., English landscape painter (died 1842)
 Edme Bovinet, French engraver (died 1832)
 Ulrika Melin, textile artist and member of the Royal Swedish Academy of Art (died 1834)
 George Watson, Scottish portrait painter (died 1837)

Deaths
 January 9 – Joseph Ignatz Sadler, Czech fresco painter (born 1725)
 February 3 – Jacob Folkema, Dutch designer and engraver (born 1692)
 March 24 – Christian Friedrich Zincke, German miniature painter (born 1683/1685)
 May 11 – Nicolas Edelinck, French-born engraver, son of Gerard Edelinck (born 1681)
 June 14 – Antonio Elenetti, Italian painter (born unknown)
 July 17 – Norbert Grund, Czech painter of the Rococo style (born 1717)
 August 17 – Gaspare Diziani, Italian Roccoco painter (born 1689)
 August 28 – Giacomo Ceruti, Italian painter of peasants (born 1698)
 September 12 – Thomas Smith (Derby), landscape painter and father of John Raphael Smith of Derby (born unknown)
 September 26 – Pietro Antonio Magatti, Italian painter known for paintings and frescoes in his hometown of Milan (born 1691)
 October 2 – Louise-Magdeleine Horthemels (born 1686)
 November 6 – Giambattista Pittoni, Italian painter of religious, historical, and mythological subjects (born 1687)
 November 11 – Clemente Ruta, Italian painter specializing in landscapes with pen and watercolor (born 1668)
 date unknown 
 Ferdinando Porta, Italian painter and engraver (born 1689)
 Giuseppe Zocchi, Italian veduta painter and printmaker (born 1711)

 
Years of the 18th century in art
1760s in art